The 1916 Maine Black Bears football team was an American football team that represented the University of Maine during the 1916 college football season. The team compiled a 0–4–3 record. Tommy Hughitt was the head coach for the second year, and William Gorham was the team captain.

Schedule

References

Maine
Maine Black Bears football seasons
College football winless seasons
Maine Black Bears football